Findhorn Viaduct is the name given to two separate railway bridges that cross the River Findhorn in Scotland:

 Findhorn Viaduct (Tomatin) near Tomatin in the Scottish Highlands
 Findhorn Viaduct (Forres) near Forres in Moray, Scotland